The Rule in Wild's Case is a common law rule of construction dating back to 1599 concerning a particular type of ambiguity in devises (such as grants or bequests) of real property:  If a grantor (O) grants, by deed or will, property to another person (A) with the language "To A and her children", who gets lawful possession of the property?

The rule resolves this ambiguity as follows:
 If A has living children at the time of the grant, A and her children take the property as joint tenants.
 If A does not have living children at the time of the grant, A takes the property in fee tail.

This rule has fallen into disuse in those jurisdictions which no longer recognize the fee tail as a legal estate.  Some U.S. states ignore the rule altogether, and interpret such a grant as giving a life estate and creating a remainder in her children.  Section 14.2 of the Restatement (Third) of Property repudiates the Rule in Wild's Case, suggesting that many authorities consider it to be obsolete.

References
Dukeminier, Jesse, Johansen, Stanley M., Lindgren, James, and Sitkoff, Robert. Wills, Trusts, and Estates, 7th Edition, p. 664. Aspen Publishers, 2005.

External links
 Article from Answers.com

1599 in law
Real property law
Common law rules
Legal history of England